Billy Cook (26 June 1940 – 2 July 2017) was a footballer who played seven times for the Australia national association football team.

Playing career

Club career
Cook played his youth football for Galston Amateurs and Ardrossan Winton Rovers before signing with Kilmarnock in 1959. He played ten matches for Kilmarnock before moving to Australia to play for Melbourne team Slavia.

International career
While playing at Slavia Cook came to the attention of the Australian selectors. Between 1965 and 1967 he played in seven full internationals for Australia, including two against Scotland, his country of birth.

Cook died on 2 July 2017, aged 77.

References

1940 births
2017 deaths
Australian soccer players
Kilmarnock F.C. players
Scottish footballers
Australia international soccer players
Scottish expatriate footballers
Scottish Football League players
Ardrossan Winton Rovers F.C. players
Association football fullbacks
Footballers from East Ayrshire